Cedric Muir (13 November 1912 – 2 June 1975) was a New Zealand cricketer. He played in one first-class match for Wellington in 1943/44.

See also
 List of Wellington representative cricketers

References

External links
 

1912 births
1975 deaths
New Zealand cricketers
Wellington cricketers
People from Patea